Forearm may refer to:
 Forearm, the structure and distal region of the upper limb
 Forearm (firearm component), the component of a firearm between the receiver and the muzzle
 Forearm (comics), a fictional Marvel villain also known as Michael McCain